Yoshika is a unisex given name of Japanese origin. It may refer to:

People
 Yoshika (singer) (born 1983), a Japanese singer
Yoshika Arai (born 1982), Japanese steeplechase runner
 Yoshika Katou, the stage name of Leilani Gaja in Japan
 Inoue Yoshika, (1845–1929) a career naval officer in the Imperial Japanese Navy 
 Yoshika Matsubara (born 1974), a retired Japanese football player
 Yoshika Mizuno (born 1955), a professional Japanese 2 dan Go player
 Yoshika Yuhnagi (1983-2001), a Japanese model

Fictional characters 
 Yoshika Miyafuji, one of the main characters in the anime adaptation of Strike Witches
 Yoshika Miyako, one of the main characters in Ten Desires
 Hanamoto Yoshika, a character and a Miko in  Yuki Yuna is a Hero: Bouquet of Brilliance.

Place names
Yoshika, Shimane, a town in Shimane Prefecture, Japan

See also
Yoshikane
Yoshikazu

Japanese unisex given names